Ludvig af Ugglas (11 August 1814 – 23 March 1880) was a Swedish politician and member of the upper house of the Parliament of Sweden.

Early life 
Ludvig af Ugglas was born at Forsmark in Uppland, Sweden, the son of Count Pehr Gustaf af Ugglas. He was as a member of the noble af Ugglas family.

Political career 
From 1840 to 1866 he served as member of the Riksdag of the Estates. In 1867, when the political system changed from a feudal assembly, he was then elected a member of the upper house of the then bicameral Riksdag.

References 

1814 births
1880 deaths
Swedish nobility
Members of the Första kammaren
19th-century Swedish politicians
Swedish counts